The 1942 New Hampshire gubernatorial election was held on November 3, 1942. Incumbent Republican Robert O. Blood defeated Democratic nominee William J. Neal with 52.18% of the vote.

General election

Candidates
Robert O. Blood, Republican
William J. Neal, Democratic

Results

References

1942
New Hampshire
Gubernatorial